Patrick Elmer McLaughlin (August 17, 1910 – November 1, 1999) was a pitcher in Major League Baseball. He played for the Detroit Tigers and Philadelphia Athletics.

References

External links
, or Retrosheet

1910 births
1999 deaths
Amarillo Gold Sox players
Baseball players from Texas
Beaumont Exporters players
Detroit Tigers players
Hollywood Stars players
Indianapolis Indians players
Longview Cannibals players
Major League Baseball pitchers
Minor league baseball managers
Muskogee Tigers players
Paris Red Peppers players
Philadelphia Athletics players
San Angelo Colts players
Seattle Rainiers players
Sherman Twins players
Shreveport Sports players
St. Edward's Hilltoppers baseball players
Toledo Mud Hens players
Toronto Maple Leafs (International League) players
Vernon Dusters players
Zanesville Indians players
Carlsbad Potashers players
Zanesville Dodgers players